Bret Victor is an interface designer, computer scientist, and electrical engineer known for his talks on the future of technology. , he worked as a researcher at Dynamicland.

Career 
Bret Victor earned his bachelor's degree in electrical engineering from the California Institute of Technology in 1999. In 2001 he graduated from the University of California, Berkeley with a master's degree in electrical engineering. After this, he spent time at Alesis, where he developed the Alesis Ion, and its successor the Alesis Micron.

Victor worked as a human interface inventor at Apple Inc. from 2007 until 2011. He was a member of the small group of people who worked on the initial design for the iPad, and contributed to the development of other products including the Apple Watch. In 2014, Victor joined the Communications Design Group as a researcher, where he worked on software to allow citizens and scientists to model and understand systems. , he worked on dynamic media at Dynamicland, a research lab he founded in Oakland, California.

Influence 
Victor received attention for his talks "Inventing on Principle" (2012) and "The Future of Programming" (2013). Some of his work focuses on the evolution of media from print to computers to future technology, which he calls "the dynamic medium". He posits that people use computers as "really fast paper emulators," and envisions future technology that can change its physical form.

A major motivation for Victor's work is to make it easier and faster to use complex tools and ideas. As part of this project he wrote an essay about using interactive models when communicating about science, which popularized the term "explorable explanation".

References 

Year of birth missing (living people)
Living people
Interface designers
Computer scientists
Electrical engineers
Human–computer interaction researchers
California Institute of Technology alumni
UC Berkeley College of Engineering alumni
Apple Inc. employees
Apple Design Awards recipients